Oweekeno is a First Nations village of the Wuikinuxv located on the north bank of the Wannock River just upstream from its mouth into Rivers Inlet and adjacent to the sport fishing resort community of community of the same name.

References

Wuikinuxv
Central Coast of British Columbia
Unincorporated settlements in British Columbia.